The Sakura catalog is an illustrated full-color Japanese stamp catalog.

The Japanese Stamp Catalog Illustrated in Colors (now Sakura Catalogue of Japanese Stamps) was first published in October 1967 with full-color illustrations, which surprised the philatelic world since a colored stamp catalog had never been thought of. Regarded as the most reliable and popular publication in Japan, it goes through fifteen editions in 1979, and more than 4,500,000 copies have been released in all. This is the companion volume to the Japanese Stamp Specialized Catalog. The catalog, nicknamed Sakura Catalog, has been in pocket-size (118 x 148 mm) for several years, but now it is printed in B6 (128 × 182 mm) size so that it can be printed using a multicolor rotary press to meet the increased circulation and to make the use of thinner paper possible. As all pages have to be composed anew for the enlarged size, English version of stamp names is added for the convenience of foreign collectors, and many symbols are used to facilitate their understanding how the stamps are classified here.

Please see the contents of the SAKURA Catalogue of Japanese Stamps 2019 and other editions.

Most recently published catalog structure 
The structure of the most recently published catalog is as follows:

Catalogue information and contents 
Catalogue Information & Contents

 Catalogue Contents in Japan
 Catalogue Information in Japan
 Catalogue Information for Users in English
 [Brief] Contents in English

Commemorative stamps

Pre-War Issues 
 Unissued

Post-War Issues 
 1st Men of Culture Series
 Tourist Series
 Flower Series
 Tokyo Olympic Games
 Season's Folklore Series
 Bird Series
 Festival Series
 Fish Series
 Famous Gardens Series
 1st National Treasure Series
 Classic Art Series
 Folk Tale Series
 Nature Conservation Series
 Steam locomotive Series
 Ship Series
 2nd National Treasure Series
 "Sumo" Ukiyoe (Picture) Series
 Modern art Series
 Japanese Song Series
 Modern Western-Style Architecture Series
 Endangered Native Bird Series
 Alpine plant Series
 1st Traditional Arts and Crafts Series
 Insect Series
 Oku no Hosomichi (Matsuo Basho's Diary) Series
 3rd National Treasure Series
 Electric locomotive Series
 Horse Series
 Kabuki Series
 Water Side Birds Series
 2nd Men of Culture Series
 Flowers of Four Seasons Series
 History of Japanese Stamp Series
 1st World Heritage Series
 50 Postwar Memorable Years Series
 My Favorite Song Series
 Traditional Japanese House Series
 20th Century Series
 2nd World Heritage Series
[Published by Japan Post]
 The 400th Anniversary of the Edo Shogunate
Science and Technology and Animation Series
 Animation Hero and Heroine Series
 3rd World Heritage Series
[Published by Japan Post Service]
 The Constellation Series
 Harmony with Nature Series
 Japanese Mountains Series
 Evocative Memory of Seasons Series
 Ukiyoe Series
 2st Japanese Traditional Craft Series
 Overseas World Heritage Series
 Vegetable & Fruits Series
 Heartwarming Animal Scene Series
 Railroad Series
 Japanese Castle Series
 "Omotenashi" (Hospitality) Flowers Series
 Tales from Stars Series
 The Treasures of the Shoso-in Series
 Nostalgia of Pictures for Children Series
 Familiar Animal Series
 Traditional Dietary Culture of Japan Series
 Japanese Night View Series
 Japanese Architecture Series
 Traditional Japanese Design Series
 My Journey Stamps Series
 Natural monument Series
 Sea Life Series
 Japanese Traditional Color Series
 Gifts from the Forest Series
 The World of Children's Picture Book Series
 Astronomical World Series

Greetings Stamps 
[Published by Japan Post]
 Chinese zodiac Sign Series
[Published by Japan Post Service]
[Published by Japan Post Co., Ltd.]
 [Hello Kitty (regional version)]

Furusato Stamps (Prefectural Issues) 
 Prefectural Flowers
[Published by Japan Post]
[Published by Japan Post Service]
 Hometowns-Scenes in My Heart Series
 Flowers of the Hometown Series
 60th Anniversary of Local Government Law
 Festivals of the Hometown Series
 Travel Scenes Series
 Seasonal Flowers Series
 Afforestation [(Greening)]
 Edo famous places and neat Ukiyoe Series
 National Athletic Meets
 [Furusato Stamps (Prefectural Issue), except the series]

National Park Stamps 
 1st National Park Series
 2st National Park Series
 Quasi-national park Series

New Year's Greeting Stamps 
[Published by Japan Post]
[Published by Japan Post Service]
[Published by Japan Post Co., Ltd.]

Definitives 
 Etched Stamps
 I Dragon Series
 II Cherry Blossom Series, Native Paper
 III Cherry Blossom Series, Transitional Period
 IV Cherry Blossom Series, Foreign Paper}}
 V Bird Stamps
 VI Cherry Blossom Series, Changed Colors
 VII Cherry Blossom Series, Changed Designs
 Koban Series
 Chrysanthemum Series
 Old High Value Issues
 Tazawa Series
 Mt. Fuji & Deer Series
 Earthquake Emergency Issue
 New High Value Issue
 Scenery Series
 Showa Stamps
 Taiwan Local Issue
 New Showa Stamps
 Vocational Series
 Showa Unwmkd. Series
 Animal, Plant, & National Treasure Series
 New Animal, Plant, & National Treasure Series
 Heisei Stamps
 [Published by Japan Post]
 [Published by Japan Post Co., Ltd.]
 For Celebration or Condolence, etc.
 [Published by Japan Post]
 P-Stamp, Frame Stamp
 [Published by Japan Post Service]
 [Published by Japan Post Co., Ltd.]
 [Sheet Inscriptions on Definitives (after Animal, Plant, & National Treasure Series)]
 [Color Marks on Definitives]
 Air Mail Stamps
 Booklets
 [Commemorative Booklets]

The outdated sections

Non-renewable issues. Till 2013 
 Military Franchise Issues
 Japanese Post offices abroad
 Korea, I.J.P.O.
 China, I.J.P.O.
 Miscellaneous
 Postal Saving Stamp
 Election Stamp
 Telegraph stamps
 Official Urgent Stamps
 Tosa Local Stamp
 Sutherland Stamps
 BANDO P.O.W. Stamps
 British Forces Occupation Issues
 "Manchukuo" Puppet Government
 Postal Savings Stamps
 Unissued
 Booklets
 Japanese Occupation Issues (fragments) ( (抜粋))
 Burma
 Java
 Japanese Naval Control Area
 Sumatra
 Malaya
 Philippine Islands
 North Borneo
 Hong Kong
 [Japanese Occupation of China (fragments)]
 North China
 Mengkiang
 Central China

Okinawa, under US Administration. Till 2014 
 Unissued

Postal stationery. Till 2015 
 Postal cards
 1 [Etched Cards. Size 78×163 mm]
 2 [Koban Cards. Size 90×142 mm]
 3 [Chrysanthemum Cards. Size 90×140 mm]
 4 ["Weights" Cards. Size 90×142 mm]
 5 [Earthquake Emergency Cards. Size 80×130 mm]
 6 [Kusunoki Masashige Cards. Size 90×140 mm]
 6A [Little Kusunoki Masashige Cards. Size 70×120 mm]
 7 [Cherry blossom Cards. Size 90×140 mm]
 8 [Rice Cards. Size 90×140 mm]
 9 [National Diet Building Cards. Size 90×140 mm]
 10 [Yumedono Cards]
 11 [Flying Mythological Creatures Cards. Size 100×148 mm]
 12 [Earthenware Cards. Size 100×148 mm]
 13 [Station bell Cards. Size 100×148 mm]
 14 [Bodhisattva Cards. Size 100×148 mm]
 15 [Fenghuang Cards. Size 100×148 mm]
 16 [Bell tower Cards. Size 100×148 mm]
 17 [Old Mandarin Duck Cards. Size 100×148 mm]
 18 [Flying Horse Cards. Size 100×148 mm]
 19 [New Mandarin Duck Cards. Size 100×148 mm]
 20 [Hand fan. Size 100×148 mm]
 International Mail Postal Cards
 Commemorative Postal Cards
 New Year's Postal Cards
 Season Greeting Postal Cards
 Blue Bird Postal Cards
 Heart Mail
 [Miscellaneous]
 [Postal Cards with Advertisements]
 [Picture Postal Cards]
 [Prefecture Postal Cards]
 Stamped envelopes
 Letter sheets
 Aerogrammes
 Cards for Parcel post
 Wrappers
 For Official Mail
 Weather Reports
 For Military Post
 Post Offices Abroad
 1 "For Use in China" Ovpt. Issue
 2 South Manchuria Railway Zone
 Taiwan and Korea Provisional Issues
 1 Taiwan Provisional Issue
 2 Korean Provisional Issue

[Some "Comb" Type Cancellations] (1983) 
 I [Main Japanese Mail]
 1 [Inland Mail]
 2 [Non-Mail Mark]
 3 [Air cargo]
 4 [Foreign Mail]
 II [Special and Military mail]
 1 [Railway Mail Service]
 2 [Seapost Service]
 3 [Military mail]
 III [Colonies]
 1 [Korea]
 2 [Taiwan]
 3 [Kwantung and South Manchuria Railway]
 4 [Sakhalin]
 5 [Shandong Peninsula]
 6 [South Pacific Mandate]
 IV [Japan Office in China]

Pre-Paid Card for Postage (Sakura 1990–Sakura 1992) 
 [National Newspaper Pre-Paid Card]
 [Local Newspaper Pre-Paid Card]

JPS Original Philatelic Materials (1999) 
 [Announcement]
 [U-Card]
 [Cards with Advertisements]
 [Stored-value cards (Fumi Cards)]}}

Small additions 
 [Perforation gauge] (Sakura 1967–Sakura 1988)
 Notices (Sakura 1980–Sakura 1994)

References 

Philately of Japan
Stamp catalogs